The Verwall Alps or Verwall Group are a mountain range of the Central Eastern Alps at the border of the Austrian states of Tyrol and Vorarlberg.

It includes the following peaks (sorted by height):

 Hoher Riffler 3,168 metres (10,394 feet)
 Kuchenspitze                                3,148 metres (10,401 feet)
 Küchlspitze                                 3,147 metres (10,315 feet)
 Patteriol                                   3,059 metres (10,037 feet)
 Saumspitze                                  3,039 metres (9,970 feet)
 Scheibler              2,978 metres (9,770 feet)
 Gaisspitze                                  2,779 metres (9,117 feet)

For a list of passes, see Passes of the Silvretta and Rätikon Ranges

The Verwall Alps border on the Silvretta Alps in the west and on the Samnaun Alps in the south.

References

 
Mountain ranges of the Alps
Central Alps
Mountain ranges of Tyrol (state)